Langat may refer to:

 Langat (surname)
 Langat River, a river in Malaysia
 Langat virus
 Langat (federal constituency), former federal constituency in Selangor, Malaysia

See also
 Lagat, a surname
 Hulu Langat, a district and parliamentary constituency in Malaysia
 2011 Hulu Langat landslide
 Kuala Langat, a district in Malaysia
 Istana Daerah Hulu Langat, a palace in Malaysia
 Jalan Ampang-Hulu Langat, a major road in Malaysia
 Jalan Hulu Langat, a major road in Malaysia
 Jalan Kawasan Perindustrian Hulu Langat, a major road in Malaysia